The 2018 M&M's 200 presented by Casey's General Store was the 9th stock car race of the 2018 NASCAR Camping World Truck Series season and the 10th iteration of the event. The race was held on Saturday, June 16, 2018 in Newton, Iowa at Iowa Speedway, a  permanent D-shaped oval racetrack. The race took the scheduled 200 laps to complete. At race's end, Brett Moffitt of Hattori Racing Enterprises would survive a hard-charging Noah Gragson and a banzai last-turn move to win his 3rd ever NASCAR Camping World Truck Series career win and the 2nd win of the season. To fill out the podium, Noah Gragson and Harrison Burton, both from Kyle Busch Motorsports would finish 2nd and 3rd, respectively.

Bryant Barnhill would try and make his first career NASCAR Camping World Truck Series start, but would fail to qualify.

Background 

Iowa Speedway is a 7/8-mile (1.4 km) paved oval motor racing track in Newton, Iowa, United States, approximately 30 miles (48 km) east of Des Moines. The track was designed with influence from Rusty Wallace and patterned after Richmond Raceway, a short track where Wallace was very successful. It has over 25,000 permanent seats as well as a unique multi-tiered Recreational Vehicle viewing area along the backstretch.

Entry list

Practice

First practice 
The first practice would take place on 8:35 AM CST.

Second and final practice 
The second and final practice would take place on 11:00 AM CST.

Qualifying 
Qualifying would take place on 3:30 PM CST. Since Iowa Speedway is under , the qualifying system was a multi-car system that included three rounds. The first round was 15 minutes, where every driver would be able to set a lap within the 15 minutes. Then, the second round would consist of the fastest 24 cars in Round 1, and drivers would have 10 minutes to set a lap. Round 3 consisted of the fastest 12 drivers from Round 2, and the drivers would have 5 minutes to set a time. Whoever was fastest in Round 3 would win the pole.

Race results 
Stage 1 Laps: 60

Stage 2 Laps: 60

Stage 3 Laps: 80

References 

2018 NASCAR Camping World Truck Series
NASCAR races at Iowa Speedway
June 2018 sports events in the United States
2018 in sports in Iowa